Emmanuel Christian School is a small private school located in Dollard-des-Ormeaux, Quebec, a city of Greater Montreal.  EMCS is a school that bases its educational and religious values on the Bible and Evangelical Protestant teachings, while simultaneously meeting or exceeding all of the educational requirements of the Ministre de l'Education, du Loisir et du Sport.

A former dispute with another Montreal area private school named "Miss Edgar and Miss Cramp's School" has led to the use of the acronym "EMCS" instead of the previous "ECS".

EMCS offers both elementary and secondary education from Kindergarten up to Grade 11. There is only one class per grade with usually 20-30 students per class. Total enrollment for the entire school is roughly 300 students. In 2009, admissions for French-speaking high school students was made possible with the establishment of the French Sector. However the high school sectors merged in 2017 and are now bilingual.
The current principal is Mr. Jean Obed Jubuisson. The High School Administrator is Mr. Alexander Ko. The Elementary School Administrator is Mrs. Judy Ikegami.

External links
Official website

Dollard-des-Ormeaux
Elementary schools in Montreal
High schools in Montreal
Private schools in Quebec